Rieppeleon kerstenii is species of chameleon, a lizard in the family Chamaeleonidae. The species is endemic to East Africa.

Geographic range
R. kerstenii is found in eastern Ethiopia, Kenya, Somalia, and northeastern Tanzania.

Common names
Common names for R. kerstenii include Kenya leaf chameleon,   Kenya pygmy chameleon,  Kenya stumptail chameleon, Kersten's pygmy chameleon, and pygmy grass chameleon.

Etymology
The specific name kerstenii honours Otto Kersten, a German chemist and traveller.

Subspecies
Two subspecies are recognized:

References

Further reading
Boulenger GA (1891). "On some Reptiles collected by Sig. Luigi Robecchi Bricchetti in Somaliland". Annali del Museo Civico di Storia Naturale di Genova, Serie Seconda 12: 5-15 + Plate I. (Rhampholeon robecchii, new species, p. 13 + Plate I, figures 3, 3a).
Peters W (1868). "Über eine neue Nagergattung, Chiropodomys pennicullatus, so wie über einige neue oder weniger bekannte Amphibien und Fische ". Monatsberichte der Königlich-Preussische Akademie der Wissenschaften zu Berlin 1868: 448–461. (Chamaeleo kerstenii, new species, p. 449). (in German).

Rieppeleon
Reptiles of Ethiopia
Reptiles of Kenya
Reptiles of Somalia
Reptiles of Tanzania
Taxa named by Wilhelm Peters
Reptiles described in 1868